Jitender Shaw (born 24 December 1993) is an Indian former cricketer. He plays first-class cricket for Bengal.

See also
 List of Bengal cricketers

References

External links
 

1993 births
Living people
Indian cricketers
Bengal cricketers
Cricketers from Kolkata